Section 90 of the Constitution of Australia prohibits the States from imposing customs duties and of excise. The section bars the States from imposing any tax that would be considered to be of a customs or excise nature. While customs duties are easy to determine, the status of excise, as summarised in Ha v New South Wales, is that it consists of "taxes on the production, manufacture, sale or distribution of goods, whether of foreign or domestic origin." This effectively means that States are unable to impose sales taxes.

Whether a State tax is of an excise nature or not has been the subject of numerous cases in the High Court of Australia, and it has had difficulty in reaching a clear majority opinion as to how "excise" should be interpreted in specific circumstances. It has been described as "one of the significant failures of the High Court."

Text

Scope
Starting with Peterswald v Bartley (1904), it was initially held that "excise" is an indirect tax, and is accordingly based on the definition given by John Stuart Mill:

However, since Dennis Hotels Pty Ltd v Victoria, it has been held that indirectness is neither a necessary nor sufficient quality for such a tax.

Since the High Court's ruling in Parton v Milk Board, subsequently endorsed unanimously in Bolton v Madsen, excise duties in the Australian context are generally agreed to apply in several situations:

 "What probably is essential is that it should be a tax upon goods before they reach the consumer."
 "A tax upon a commodity at any point in the course of distribution before it reaches the consumer produces the same effect as a tax upon its manufacture or production."
 "It is probably a safe inference ... that a tax on consumers or upon consumption cannot be an excise."

In Hematite Petroleum Pty Ltd v Victoria, it was further held:

In Gosford Meats Pty Ltd v New South Wales, Gibbs CJ summarised the position by stating that "an impost cannot be an excise unless it is a tax upon, or in respect of, a step in the production, manufacture, sale or distribution of goods."

While the reasoning of these cases appears straightforward, the application has not. The High Court held in a series of cases that license and franchise fees did not constitute "excise", such as:

a levy of six per cent of the wholesale value of liquor on liquor retailers (Dennis Hotels);
a license fee scheme for the sale of petrol (HC Sleigh);
a licence fee calculated using a back-dating device (i.e., by reference to results of a preceding period) (Parton); and
a tobacco licensing scheme (Dickenson's Arcade, Philip Morris).

However, other taxes have been held to be "excise":

a levy which fell equally upon local and imported petrol (Petrol Case);
a consumption tax on tobacco (Dickenson's Arcade);
taxing receipts issued by vendors that acknowledged payment of the purchase price of commodities (Hamersley);
a tax on the processing of fish intended for human consumption (MG Kailis);
a tax on livestock used in the production of meat or wool (Logan Downs);
a pipeline charge held to be an excise on petrol (Hematite);
a meat industry licence (Gosford Meats); and
an X-rated video licensing scheme (Capital Duplicators).

But Ha v New South Wales has since cast doubt on State licensing schemes previously held to be valid for tobacco, alcohol and petrol, and which have accounted for a significant portion of State revenues. Ha held that where such a scheme is not in reality of a regulatory nature, it is therefore invalid:

This has created significant debate as to the validity of other State taxation schemes, such as in the recent trend for States to extend stamp duty to certain dealings in goods.

Significant cases

Further reading

References

Australian constitutional law
Australian Customs and Border Protection Service